Frederick Yeomans (11 November 1888 – 16 January 1965) was an Australian cricketer. He played one first-class cricket match for Victoria in 1915. In his district career Yeoman represented Northcotes becoming popular and consistently scoring runs into the early 1920s.

See also
 List of Victoria first-class cricketers

References

External links
 

1888 births
1965 deaths
Australian cricketers
Victoria cricketers
Cricketers from Melbourne